Sander Dreesmann (born 21 August 1977) is a former Dutch field hockey player.

He played for the Dutch hockey team HC Klein Zwitserland.

External links
Sander Dreesmann profile 

Dutch male field hockey players
Living people
1977 births
Place of birth missing (living people)
HC Klein Zwitserland players
21st-century Dutch people